Aldair Ribeiro de Souza (born 5 May 1996), commonly known as Aldair, is a Brazilian footballer who currently plays as a forward for PSTC, on loan from Francisco Ferro Sports.

Career statistics

Club

Notes

References

1996 births
Living people
Brazilian footballers
Association football forwards
Paraná Soccer Technical Center players